Ceradocus is a genus of amphipods in the family, Maeridae, and was first described in 1853 by Achille Costa.  The type species is Ceradocus orchestiipes.

Species
Species accepted by WoRMS
in the subgenus Ceradocus:
Ceradocus laevis 
Ceradocus oliveri 
Ceradocus orchestiipes 
Ceradocus wooree 

in the subgenus Ceradocus (Denticeradocus) 
Ceradocus alama 
Ceradocus circe 
Ceradocus cotonensis 
Ceradocus crenatipalma 
Ceradocus dooliba 
Ceradocus greeni 
Ceradocus hawaiensis 
Ceradocus inermis 
Ceradocus isimangaliso 
Ceradocus koreanus 
Ceradocus mahafalensis 
Ceradocus oxyodus 
Ceradocus paucidentatus 
Ceradocus ramsayi 
Ceradocus rubromaculatus 
Ceradocus serratus 
Ceradocus sheardi 
Ceradocus shoalsi 
Ceradocus spinifer 
Ceradocus vaderi 
Ceradocus yandala 
Species not allocated to a subgenus:
Ceradocus adangensis 
Ceradocus andamanensis 
Ceradocus baudini 
Ceradocus breweri 
Ceradocus capensis 
Ceradocus chevreuxi 
Ceradocus chiltoni 
Ceradocus colei 
Ceradocus diversimanus 
Ceradocus kiiensis 
Ceradocus mizani 
Ceradocus multidentatus 
Ceradocus nanhaiensis 
Ceradocus natalensis 
Ceradocus nghisonensis 
Ceradocus parkeri 
Ceradocus sellickensis 
Ceradocus setosus 
Ceradocus shoemakeri 
Ceradocus spinicauda 
Ceradocus tattersalli

References

External links
Ceradocus images & occurrence data from GBIF

Crustacean genera
Crustaceans described in 1853
Taxa named by Achille Costa
Gammaridea